Agus Cima (born November 8, 1983) is an Indonesian former professional footballer who plays as a full-back.

Club career statistics

References

External links

1983 births
Association football defenders
Living people
Indonesian footballers
Liga 1 (Indonesia) players
PSPS Pekanbaru players
Indonesian Premier Division players
PSMS Medan players